Iain "Huey" Hewitson (born 4 October 1948), is a New Zealand-born chef, restaurateur, author and television personality who moved to Australia in 1972. He is best known for his television involvement with Network Ten. He was also the face of supermarket chain BI-LO.

TV career
Between 1992 and 1998, Hewitson appeared on the Ten lifestyle show Healthy, Wealthy and Wise, in which he presented the cooking segments. Until December 2005, Hewitson was a regular chef on the networks morning talk program GMA with Bert Newton. Ensuing programs with his participation include Huey's TV Dinner and Never Trust a Skinny Cook. 
He has been the main host of Huey's Cooking Adventures (1997–2010) and Huey's Kitchen (2010–2014).

Restaurants
 Tolarno Eating House & Bar, St Kilda, Victoria, Australia
 Big Huey's Diner, South Melbourne, Victoria, Australia

Musician
In the 1960s, Hewitson was a folk singer as well as a member of bands "Cellophane" and "Sebastian's Floral Array". Both of them were winners in the New Zealand version of the Battle of the Bands competitions.

In 1968, he became a member of a band called 691. At the end of the year the band had become Cellophane. The line-up included Hewitson on vocals, Dave Wellington on lead guitar, Michael Hill on bass, Pam Potter on keyboards, and John Van der Ryden on drums. They were managed by Colin Misseldine. In 1969 they recorded and self-produced four tracks at HMV studios for Pye. The songs included a cover of the Arthur Brown psychedelic rock hit, "Fire"; "Mind Patterns", which was written by Hewitson; and "I Can’t Quit Her". The band broke up in 1970. "Fire", backed with "Mind Patterns", was released on Pye 7N-14009. Both "Hey Joe" by Sebastian's Floral Array, and "Fire" by Cellophane, appear on the various artists compilation, A Day in My Mind's Mind Volume 4.

According to Hewitson, one of his favorite things is the Rickenbacker guitar along with the Vox amplifier his wife bought for him as a surprise Christmas present.

In 2009, at the end of one of his shows, he got his guitar out and, along with his seven-year-old daughter Charlotte, sang "Octopus's Garden", a Beatles song.

Releases

Books
 Never Trust a Skinny Cook : Huey's Culinary Travelogue – Allen & Unwin – 2005 – 
 Huey's Greatest Hits – Allen & Unwin – 2003 –  
 A Cook's Journey More Than 150 Recipes from TV's Top Chef – Viking, Melbourne, 1993 – 
 The Huey Diet – Allen & Unwin -2001 –

References

External links 
 Hewitson's YouTube Channel
 Audio Culture – Cellophane history, featuring info on Hewitson

Australian television presenters
Australian television chefs
Australian businesspeople
Naturalised citizens of Australia
New Zealand emigrants to Australia
People from Ōtaki, New Zealand
Living people
1948 births
New Zealand guitarists
New Zealand male guitarists